
The following lists events that happened during 1814 in South Africa.

Events
 13 August - The French are defeated by the British and the Netherlands is reverted to a monarchy. In the complex peace treaty, the Cape Colony is permanently taken from the Dutch by the United Kingdom.
 A mail packet service is started between Great Britain and the Cape

Births
 27 May - William Guybon Atherstone, medical practitioner, naturalist and geologist, (d. 1898)
 5 June - John Molteno, future first Prime Minister of the Cape

References
See Years in South Africa for list of References

Years in South Africa